Alkalihalobacillus haemicellulosilyticus is a bacterium from the genus of Alkalihalobacillus.

References

Bacillaceae
Bacteria described in 2005